George J. Tomeh  1922(Damascus, Syria) was an author, diplomat, and spokesman of the Arab cause in the United States.

Education
Tomeh obtained a master of arts degree from the American University of Beirut and a doctorate from Georgetown University in Washington, D.C.

Career

Diplomat
Beginning in 1945, Tomeh represented the Syrian government in various capacities. Tomeh began his diplomatic career at the Syrian Embassy in London.  He later served as Consul General of the United Arab Republic (Syria and Egypt) in New York City. Finally, he was appointed as Permanent Representative (Ambassador) of the Syrian Arab Republic to the United Nations. At the United Nations, Tomeh was a member of the committees dealing with the definition of aggression, decolonization and apartheid. In November 1970, he was the president of the Security Council. He was also appointed as minister of economics of the Syrian Government in 1964.

Educator
In 1965, he was appointed professor of philosophy at the Syrian University. Tomeh was founding president (1988–1990) of University of Balamand in Lebanon where he was professor of philosophy and history as well. Aside from teaching Dr.Tomeh has written books in Arabic and in English.

Advisor
Tomeh served as an advisor to the Arab Petroleum Exporting Countries (OAPEC) following his resignation from politics.

References

Syrian Christians
1922 births
Permanent Representatives of Syria to the United Nations
Syrian ministers of economy
Syrian expatriates in Lebanon
Syrian expatriates in the United States
Syrian expatriates in the United Kingdom
American University of Beirut alumni
Georgetown University alumni
Academic staff of Damascus University
Academic staff of the University of Balamand